Undredal Stave Church is a parish church of the Church of Norway in Aurland Municipality in Vestland county, Norway. It is located in the village of Undredal, on the shore of the Aurlandsfjorden. It is the church for the Undredal parish which is part of the Sogn prosti (deanery) in the Diocese of Bjørgvin. The white, wooden church was built in a stave church style around the year 1147.

The church is only  and has only 40 seats, making it the smallest stave church still in use in all of Scandinavia. The parish only includes one small, rather isolated valley, with only 116 parishioners, making it the second smallest parish in the Diocese of Bjørgvin.

History
Undredal Stave Church was built in the middle of the 12th century, possibly from the year 1147, but very likely from the mid- to late-1100s. There is some evidence that the church was taken apart and moved during the Middle Ages, but this is not known for sure. The original part of the church includes roughly the eastern 2/3rds of the present building. The original church had a  nave and a  chancel. Around the year 1600, the choir was rebuilt and enlarged, measuring about  after its completion. Originally, the church had a covered corridor that ran around the exterior of the church (as seen in many stave churches). This corridor was removed around 1685 and windows were installed in the walls of the nave. In 1862, the wall between the nave and chancel was removed and the ceiling was arched. The small 2nd floor seating gallery was also removed during this time. In 1913, there were plans to dismantle the church and move it to a museum in the village of Kaupanger (in Sogndal), but this never happened because money was never raised to replace the old church. Instead it was reconstructed in 1984 and underwent extensive maintenance work. Inside the church, the ceiling is decorated with biblical figures and angels.

Media gallery

See also
 List of churches in Bjørgvin

References

Other sources

External links
 
 Undredal stave church in Stavkirke.org 
 Undredal stavkyrkje
 Undredal stavkyrkje
 Undredal area

Aurland
Churches in Vestland
Stave churches in Norway
Wooden churches in Norway
12th-century churches in Norway
12th-century establishments in Norway